Bhim Singh (born 13 April 1945 in Dhanana) is an Indian former high jumper who competed in the 1968 Summer Olympics.
On his name the "highest sports award  of haryana"
Bhim Award given every year
Amount of 5 lakh given in this prize

Bheem stadium of bhiwani is also in the memory of bheem singh

References

1945 births
Living people
Indian male high jumpers
Olympic athletes of India
Athletes (track and field) at the 1968 Summer Olympics
Asian Games medalists in athletics (track and field)
Athletes (track and field) at the 1966 Asian Games
Athletes (track and field) at the 1970 Asian Games
Medalists at the 1966 Asian Games
Medalists at the 1970 Asian Games
Asian Games gold medalists for India
Asian Games bronze medalists for India
Athletes (track and field) at the 1966 British Empire and Commonwealth Games
Athletes (track and field) at the 1970 British Commonwealth Games
Commonwealth Games competitors for India
Athletes from Haryana
Recipients of the Arjuna Award